The Remington RM380 is a semi-automatic, .380 ACP caliber pistol produced by Remington Arms.  The RM380 is a redesign of the Rohrbaugh 380 pistol, itself a version of the 9x19mm Rohrbaugh R9.  The two models differ most notably in the location of the magazine release and the incorporation of a slide stop on the Remington.  While the Rohrbaugh used a heel-magazine release at the base of the grip, the RM380 release is located at the rear of the trigger guard. The Remington also has a restyled grip frame that incorporates a larger beavertail.

References

.380 ACP semi-automatic pistols
Remington Arms firearms